Joan Esterle is an American-Australian geologist who is an emeritus professor at school of Earth and Environmental Sciences from The University of Queensland, Australia and the chair of its Coal Geoscience Program.

Early career 

Esterle graduated in geology by the University of Kentucky, USA in 1990. Then she joined the University of Canterbury, New Zealand, as a post doctoral fellow.  She started working with CSIRO since 1992, as a junior scientist in the Geomechanics Division (nowadays renowned as the Exploration and Mining Division) and then with the GeoGAS-Runge Group in Brisbane, Australia. Then in 2004 she join the team of the University of Queensland.

Career and impact 

Esterle is known for her research on Queensland geology, in particular, on the properties of coal. She also has extensive research on the bio-influence in coal characterization and the geomorphological evolution of basins and geohazards assessment in mines.

Esterle has developed 3D models to analyse the geological history of coal, to predict geohazards and applied to evaluation of gas resources, and geosequestration. She has been working with industry partners such as VALE conducting research through the Australian Coal Research Program (ACARP), The Australian National Low Emissions Coal Research, and the UQ Centre for Coal Seam Gas.

She is author of 85 peer-reviewed publications (consisting of 43 conference papers, 41 journal articles and a book chapter) [3]. She is member of the Bowen Basin Geologist's Group, and the Geological Society of Australia Coal Geology Group. 
 
Esterle has  served as coach, mentor, trainer, guide to undergraduate and post graduate students during her career in the University of Queensland [3].

Awards and honors 
Esterle won the  Dorothy Hill Medal from the Queensland Division of the Geological Society of Australial.

In 2015 she was nominated to The Leichhardt Award for her contribution to the advancement of Coal Geology or Related Disciplines in Queensland.

She was keynote speaker in the International Conference and Exhibition on Energy and Environment – Challenges and Opportunities (ENCO-2019).

Selected works 

 Geochemistry of apatite in Late Permian coals, Bowen Basin, Australia
 In situ techniques for classifying apatite in coal
 Stratigraphic constraints on the Lower Cretaceous Orallo Formation, southeastern Queensland: U–Pb dating of bentonite and palynostratigraphy of associated strata
 Evidence for an Early-Middle Jurassic fluid event constrained by Sm-Nd, Sr isotopes, rare earth elements and yttrium in the Bowen Basin, Australia
 Controls on Gas Domains and Production Behaviour in A High-Rank CSG Reservoir: Insights from Molecular and Isotopic Chemistry of Co-Produced Waters and Gases from the Bowen Basin, Australia
Impact of Coal Mass Structure on Fragmentation During Mining and Processing

References

External links 
Joan Esterle at the University of Queensland

Australian geologists
American geologists
Living people
University of Kentucky alumni
Academic staff of the University of Canterbury
Academic staff of the University of Queensland
Year of birth missing (living people)